Bid Shahr (also Romanized as Bīd Shahr) is a village in, Bid Shahr Rural District, Bidshahr district, Evaz County, Fars Province, Iran. At the 2006 census, its population was 3,872, in 709 families.

The residents refer to themselves as Khodmooni and their language is Achomi.

References 

Populated places in Evaz County